Vicente Rojo Lluch (8 October 1894 – 15 June 1966) was Chief of the General Staff of the Spanish Armed Forces  during the Spanish Civil War.

Early life
He was the posthumous son of a military man who fought against the Carlists and in the campaigns of Cuba, from where he returned ill.

In 1911 Rojo entered the Infantry Academy at the Alcazar of Toledo, receiving his commission in 1914 with the rank of second lieutenant, fourth in a class of 390 cadets. After having been assigned to Barcelona he went on to the Group of Regulars from Ceuta (the Regulares were Moroccan colonial troops with Spanish officers). He was later posted back to Barcelona and to La Seu d'Urgell.

In 1922, having risen to the rank of captain, he returned to the Infantry Academy in Toledo, where he occupied diverse educational and administrative positions. He was one of the editors of the curricula on the subjects of "Tactics", "Weaponry" and "Firepower" for the new section of the Military Academy of Zaragoza. In this period at the Academy he collaborated on the foundation and direction of the Military Bibliographical Collection, along with captain Emilio Alamán.

In August 1932, he left the Academy to enter the Superior War School with the objective to make the course of the General Staff. During his time at the academy, a peculiar event took place in which he proposed to the cadets a tactical assumption that consisted of passing through the river Ebro to establish a route in the Reus-Granadella, an operation very similar to one a few years later, during the civil war, he would later put into practice in the famous Battle of the Ebro in the area between Mequinenza and Amposta. He was promoted to major on 25 February 1936.

Spanish Civil War 
When the Civil War started (July 1936), Rojo - a devout Catholic, and linked to the conservative Unión Militar Española - stayed loyal to the Republican Government and was one of the military professionals who participated in the reorganization of the Spanish Republican Army.

In October 1936 he was promoted to lieutenant colonel and was designated head of the General Staff of the Forces of Defense commanded by General Jose Miaja, head of the Junta de Defensa de Madrid created to defend the capital at all costs after the transfer of the Republican government from Madrid to Valencia. In this capacity he prepared an effective defense plan for the city that prevented its fall. Afterwards, his fame as an organizer increased. As head of the Central Army HQ, he demonstrated outstanding performance in the planning of the main operations developed by the mentioned Army, in the battles of Jarama, Guadalajara, Brunete and Belchite.

On 24 March 1937 he was promoted to colonel, and after the formation of the Negrín government in May, was made Head of the General Command Staff of the Armed Forces and head of the General Staff of the Ground forces. From this new position he was in charge of directing the expansion of the People's Army, and created the denominated Mobile Army, that served as the offensive advance force of the Republican Army.

On 22 September 1937 he was promoted to the rank of general. Throughout that year he planned the offensives of Huesca, Brunete, Belchite, Zaragoza and Teruel. He was awarded the highest Republican decoration, the "Placa Laureada de Madrid" on 11 January 1938 for his planning of the last mentioned operation.

The most ambitious operation he carried out throughout 1938 was the offensive of the Ebro, a plan that grew from the previously mentioned tactical assumption developed in the Superior War School, that gave rise to the long running battles of the Ebro that developed from 25 July to 16 November 1938. In these battles the Republic gambled its international prestige, its endurance and the possibility of being able to give a favorable turn to the course of the war. In December 1938 he planned an offensive in Andalusia and Extremadura in order to halt the Nationalist offensive against Catalonia, but the generals Matallana and Miaja rejected the plan and the offensive didn't start until January 1939 and failed.

Exile 
After the fall of Catalonia, in February 1939, he moved with the government to France, where on 12 February 1939 he was promoted to the rank of Lieutenant General, only the second one in the Republican army.

After a brief stay in that country, the Service of Emigration of Spanish Republicans (SERE) paid his passage to Buenos Aires. Between 1943 and 1956 he taught as a professor at the military school of Bolivia.

Rojo has been considered one of the most prestigious military officers of the Republic, and of the war as a whole. His figure was respected even by his Nationalist opponents. The most surprising homage is Francisco Franco's portrayal of him in the film Raza.

Return to Spain and death 
In February 1957 he returned to Spain, where most of his family already lived. This return was made possible through a series of negotiations which involved several Nationalist military officers in Madrid, F. José Luís Almenar Betancourt S.J., a Jesuit who was in contact with him during his stay in Bolivia, and the Bishop of Cochabamba, a former military chaplain who had served under Rojo.

Although he was not bothered in the beginning by the Francoist authorities, on 16 July 1957 the Special Court for the Repression of Masonry and Communism informed him that he would be prosecuted for the crime of military rebellion, in his position as ex-commander of the Army. This was the customary charge for professional military officers who had not joined the rebels in 1936. He was sentenced to 30 years, but did not serve a single day as the sentence was suspended, and he was soon pardoned.

Franco held Rojo in such high esteem that he granted him the pension due a Lt. General of the Spanish army upon his return to Spain.  A number of nationalist officers have publicly said that if Rojo had been allowed to conduct operations without the interference of Soviet officers, the outcome of the war might have been different.  ("Franco:  The Man and his Nation"; George Hills.  Macmillan Company (1967).

Vicente Rojo died at his home in Madrid on 15 June 1966. Of the obituaries appearing in the Spanish press, only the one in El Alcázar, – mouthpiece of the Francoist ex-combatants – and the one by noted Falangist writer Rafael Garcia Serrano in the party press, amply eulogized his military achievements.

He wrote several books detailing his military experiences in the civil war, which were published in the following order: ¡Alerta a los pueblos! (1939), ¡España heroica! (1961) and Así fue la defensa de Madrid (1967).

Notes

References 
 
 
 
 

1894 births
1966 deaths
People from Costera
Spanish generals
People of the Rif War
Spanish military personnel of the Spanish Civil War (Republican faction)